Jud Hurd (1913 – September 14, 2005) was a syndicated newspaper cartoonist. His work included Ticker Toons and  Health Capsules (syndicated by United Feature Syndicate), for which he was awarded the National Cartoonist Society Special Features Award for 1978.

He was also the publisher & editor of the quarterly magazine Cartoonist Profiles for 36 years,] beginning with its premier issue in 1969 and ending with #146 in 2005.

References

External links
 National Cartoonist Society Awards
 Cartoonist Profiles website

1913 births
2005 deaths
American cartoonists